Wonju station is a railway station in the city of Wonju, Gangwon province, South Korea. It is on the Jungang Line.

External links
 Wonju Station

Railway stations in Gangwon Province, South Korea
Transport in Wonju
Railway stations opened in 1940
Cultural Heritage of early modern times of South Korea